Orge Patterson Cooper (November 26, 1917 – March 15, 1993) was a professional baseball player. He played parts of two seasons in Major League Baseball, 1946 and 1947, for the Philadelphia Athletics. Cooper's minor league career spanned fifteen seasons, from 1936 until 1950.

In 1946, Cooper appeared in one game as a pitcher, pitching one scoreless inning in a game on May 11. In 1947, he appeared in 13 games, one as a first baseman and the rest as a pinch hitter.

References

Major League Baseball pitchers
Major League Baseball first basemen
Philadelphia Athletics players
Greensburg Red Wings players
Kinston Eagles players
Decatur Commodores players
Lynchburg Grays players
Mount Airy Graniteers players
Lynchburg Senators players
Savannah Indians players
Martinsville A's players
Burlington Bees (Carolina League) players
Baseball players from North Carolina
1917 births
1993 deaths